Chaku Khola Hydropower Station is a run-of-the-river hydroelectric power station with an installed capacity of 3 MW. The power station is located in Sindhupalchok District, Nepal. The plant is operated by Alliance Power Nepal, an IPP.

Accidents
2015 October: The project was severely damaged due to aftershock of the Gorkha Earthquake.
2019 July: Two staffs were killed due to flood in the river.

See also
Nepal Electricity Authority
List of power stations in Nepal

References

Hydroelectric power stations in Nepal
Run-of-the-river power stations
Buildings and structures in Sindhupalchowk District